Dunes is the second studio album by American rock band Gardens & Villa. Produced by Tim Goldsworthy it was released on February 4, 2014 on Secretly Canadian.

The band recorded the album at Key Club in Benton Harbor, Michigan. The group spent a month in the space working on the record, only leaving five times throughout the process. The album title, Dunes, was inspired by one of these ventures out of the studio to Michigan's sand and snow dunes.

With the album announcement, Gardens & Villa released the first single from the album, called "Bullet Train." The album received generally favorable reviews.

Track listing

References

2014 albums
Gardens & Villa albums
Secretly Canadian albums